Andreas Embirikos (September 2, 1901 in  Brăila – August 3, 1975 in Kifissia, Attica) was a Greek surrealist poet and one of the first Greek psychoanalysts.

Life
Embirikos was born in Brăila, Romania into a wealthy Greek family. His father Leonidas Embirikos was an important ship-owner and politician. His family soon moved to Ermoupolis in Syros, one of the Greek islands in the Aegean Sea. When Embirikos was only seven years old they moved to Athens. While he was still a teenager his parents divorced; he started studying at the School of Philosophy of the National and Capodistrian University of Athens, but he decided to move to Lausanne to stay with his mother without graduating from the university.

The following years Embirikos studied a variety of subjects both in France and in the United Kingdom where he studied at King's College London; however it was in Paris where he decided to study psychoanalysis together with René Laforgue and joined the International Psychoanalytical Association.

Timeline
 1929  Meets with the surrealists and is interested in automatic writing.
 1931  Returns to Greece and works for some time at the shipdocks.
 1934  Develops an intermittent companionship to Marguerite Yourcenar.
 1935  Gives the famous lecture On surrealism (Περί σουρρεαλισμού) in Athens and publishes Blast furnace; a pure surrealist text.
 1940  Gets married with poet Matsi Hatzilazarou; nevertheless, they divorced four years later. The same year he divorced (1944), despite his leftist sympathies, he was taken hostage by the communist OPLA after the Dekemvriana events in Athens and was treated in a humiliating way. On the road he managed to escape.
 1947  Gets married for the second time with Vivika Zisi. A year later, his father, with whom Embeirikos' relationship was rather normal, dies in Geneva.
 1962  Together with Yorgos Theotokas and Odysseas Elytis, he was invited to travel to the USSR by the "Greco-Soviet" Union; the trip inspired him to write the poem ES ES ES ER Rossia.
 1975  He dies in Kifissia; his mother preceded him by only two years.

Poetry
His poetry can be defined by two major tendencies. On the one hand, he was one of the major representatives of surrealism in Greece. His first poetic collection, Ipsikaminos (ie blast furnace), was a heretic book, characterized by the lack of the punctuation and the peculiarity of the language. As the poet himself admitted it was precisely the originality and extravagance of his work that contributed to his relative commercial success.

On the other hand, together with Yorgos Seferis, Embirikos was the most important representative of the "Generation of the '30s". He contributed greatly to the introduction of modernism in Greek letters and he helped change once and for all the poetic atmosphere of Greece.

Megas Anatolikos
Α significant work by Embirikos is his pornographic  novel Megas Anatolikos written between 1940–c. 1970 and published only after his death in 1990. In this work, Embirikos narrates the first trip of the ocean liner Great Eastern (Μέγας Ἀνατολικός) from England to America. Embirikos describes the Great Eastern as a hedonic vessel, where the multitude of the passengers enjoy love without and beyond limits. During the ten-day trip (an allusion to the Decameron) they discover a new form of happiness and innocence. For this work, Odysseas Elytis called Embirikos "a visionary and a prophet".

Literary critic
Embirikos also wrote articles of literary criticism; at least two of them are worth-mentioning. The first is "The hidden necrophilia in the works of Edgar Allan Poe"; the second, "Nikos Engonopoulos or the miracle of Elbassan and Bosphorus".

Photography
Embirikos was an enthusiastic photographer all his life, and the sheer volume of his photographic work, no less than his passionate involvement with the medium, suggest that it was, for him, very nearly as important an activity as writing. Yiorgis Yiatromanolakis (Γιώργης Γιατρομανωλάκης), Embirikos's principal Greek scholar, has written that "his three principal identities are those of a poet, a novelist and a photographer". For his part, Embirikos's son, Leonidas, has referred to his father's "vast, vertiginously extensive photographic archive... the negatives alone exceeding 30,000 items".

Embirikos only ever publicly exhibited his photographs once in his lifetime, showing a limited number of prints at the Ilissos gallery in Athens, in 1955. However, as part of the celebrations for the centenary of his birth in 2001, the photographer and critic John Stathatos (Γιάννης Σταθάτος) was commissioned to research the archive and curate a large exhibition at the Technopolis Arts Centre in Athens. A substantial monograph incorporating Stathatos's text was simultaneously published by Agra Editions.

Selected works
 Blast furnace (Ὑψικάμινος), 1935
 Hinterland (Ἐνδοχώρα), 1945
 Writings or Personal Mythology (Γραπτά ἤ Προσωπική Μυθολογία), 1960
 ES ES ES ER Rossia (ΕΣ ΕΣ ΕΣ ΕΡ Ρωσσία), 1962
 Argo or Aerostat Flight (Ἄργώ ἤ Πλούς Αεροστάτου), 1964
 Oktana (Ὀκτάνα), 1980 
 Every Generation or Today as Tomorrow and as Yesterday (Αἱ Γενεαί Πᾶσαι ἤ Ἡ Σήμερον ὡς Αὔριον καί ὡς Χθές), 1985
 Armala or Introduction to a city (Ἄρμαλα ἤ Εἰσαγωγή σέ μία πόλι), 1985
 The Great Eastern (Ό Μέγας Ἀνατολικός), 1990
 Zemphyra or The Secret of Pasiphae (Ζεμφύρα ή Το Μυστικόν της Πασιφάης), 1997
 Nikos Engonopoulos or the miracle of Elbassan and Bosphorus, 2000
 Lecture 1963, 2000
 prologue in Marie Bonaparte's book The hidden necrophilia in the work of Edgar Poe, (Η λανθάνουσα νεκροφιλία στο έργο του Έδγαρ Πόε, 2000)
 A Case of Obsessive-Compulsive Neurosis with Premature Ejaculations and Other Psychoanalytic Texts (Μια Περίπτωσις Ιδεοψυχαναγκαστικής Νευρώσεως με Πρόωρες Εκσπερματώσεις και Άλλα Ψυχαναλυτικά Κείμενα, 2005)
 a translation of Picasso's The four little girls, 1980
 Amour, Amour: writings or personal mythology, tr. N. Stangos, A. Ross (1966).

Notes

External links
Short introduction to the poet. https://www.academia.edu/31629216/Andreas_Embiricos_Writer_Poet_Photographer_Psychoanalyst_KCL_Alumnus
Matsi Hatzilazarou's poems from Translatum's anthology of Poets from Thessaloniki

1901 births
1975 deaths
Romanian people of Greek descent
National and Kapodistrian University of Athens alumni
Alumni of King's College London
Modern Greek poets
Greek surrealist writers
Generation of the '30s
Surrealist poets
People from Brăila
Greek psychoanalysts
20th-century Greek poets
Greek photographers
Greek art critics
Romanian emigrants to Greece
People from Ermoupoli
Writers from Athens